James Smith (born 1873; date of death unknown) was a footballer who played for Kilmarnock and Burslem Port Vale in the 1890s.

Career
Smith played for Kilmarnock, before joining English club Burslem Port Vale in September 1894. He bagged a goal on his debut – a 4–4 draw with Newcastle United at the Athletic Ground on 6 October. He was a regular for the 1894–95 season, claiming five goals in 20 Second Division games, but was released in March 1895.

Career statistics
Source:

References

1873 births
Year of death missing
Footballers from Stirling
Scottish footballers
Association football midfielders
Kilmarnock F.C. players
Port Vale F.C. players
Preston North End F.C. players
English Football League players